Cochylimorpha eburneana is a species of moth of the family Tortricidae. It is found in Asia Minor, Turkey, Central Asia, Afghanistan, Armenia and Iran.

References

Moths described in 1899
Cochylimorpha
Moths of Asia